NCAA Basketball 09 is the 2008 installment in the NCAA Basketball series. It was released on November 17, 2008 for the PlayStation 3, PlayStation 2, and Xbox 360. Cleveland Cavaliers player Kevin Love (who was a UCLA forward at the time) is featured on the cover. A special edition called NCAA Basketball 09: March Madness Edition was released only for Xbox 360 on March 11, 2009.

Reception

The game received "mixed or average reviews" on all platforms according to the review aggregation website Metacritic.

After seeing his likeness in this game, without his permission, Ed O'Bannon agreed to be the lead plaintiff in O'Bannon v. NCAA.

See also
NBA Live 09

References

External links
 

2008 video games
Basketball video games
EA Sports games
NCAA video games
North America-exclusive video games
PlayStation 2 games
PlayStation 3 games
Video games developed in Canada
Xbox 360 games